The 2001–02 California Golden Bears men's basketball team represented the University of California, Berkeley during the 2001–02 season.

Led by head coach Ben Braun, the Bears finished the regular season with a 12–6 record in the Pac-10, placing them in second. The Bears would receive an at-large bid into the NCAA tournament where they defeated No. 11 seed Penn before falling to No. 3 seed Pittsburgh in the second round. The team finished the season with an overall record of 23–9.

Roster

Schedule and results

|-
!colspan=9 style=| Regular Season

|-
!colspan=9 style=| Pac-10 Tournament

|-
!colspan=9 style=| NCAA Tournament

Rankings

Team players in the 2002 NBA draft

References

California Golden Bears men's basketball seasons
California
California
California Golden Bear
California Golden Bear